The Nitrosopumilaceae are a family of the Archaea order Nitrosopumilales.

Taxonomy
Phylogeny of Nitrosopumilaceae

References

Further reading

Scientific journals

Scientific books

Scientific databases

External links

Archaea taxonomic families
Archaea
Candidatus taxa